Bruno Clerbout (born 6 October 1976) is a Belgian professional triathlete who competed for the Uplace Pro Triathlon Team. Clerbout, born in Kapelle o/d Bos (Belgium), became a professional triathlete in 2008. His most remarkable results include a victory in the 2017 Ironman Vichy and a fourth place in the France Ironman and the Embrunman. In 2009, Clerbout won the Kapelle-op-den-Bos quarter triathlon. That same year, he crossed the Hawaii Ironman finish line, his first time competing in the race, as the second Belgian in 24th position.

Bart Decru serves as Bruno’s coach. Bruno is a member of the Iron Team Mechelen.

Results

References

External links
 Official web site
 Bruno's results on the-sports.org
 Bruno's results on triresults.com

1976 births
Living people
Belgian male triathletes
Sportspeople from Flemish Brabant